Rhoads's Oldfield mouse (Thomasomys rhoadsi) is a species of rodent in the family Cricetidae.
It is found only in Ecuador.

References
 Baillie, J. 1996.  Thomasomys rhoadsi.   2006 IUCN Red List of Threatened Species.   Downloaded on 20 July 2007.
Musser, G. G. and M. D. Carleton. 2005. Superfamily Muroidea. pp. 894–1531 in Mammal Species of the World a Taxonomic and Geographic Reference. D. E. Wilson and D. M. Reeder eds. Johns Hopkins University Press, Baltimore.

Thomasomys
Mammals of Ecuador
Mammals described in 1914
Taxonomy articles created by Polbot